Ilan D. Hall is an American chef, television personality, and restaurateur. He won the second season of Top Chef, and is owner-chef of Ramen Hood in Los Angeles.

Early life and education
Hall is a native of Great Neck, New York. His parents were both immigrants: his father from Glasgow, Scotland, and his mother from Israel. Both his parents were from Jewish families.

As a teenager, Hall worked at Marine Fishery, a seafood store in his hometown of Great Neck and was later trained at Italy's Lorenzo de' Medici Apicus Program, and at the Culinary Institute of America (CIA).

Career
In 2007, Hall won season two of Top Chef, second season. Ilan was a line cook at Casa Mono, a Spanish restaurant in Manhattan. He had a rivalry with Marcel Vigneron during the show, with whom he attended culinary school simultaneously. Bravo ranked "The Head Shaving Incident" involving Hall and Vigneron as "probably the biggest scandal in Top Chef history."

In August 2009, he opened his first restaurant, The Gorbals, in downtown Los Angeles. Less than a week after opening, The county health department shut down the Gorbals because of an inadequate water heater. It reopened on October 23, 2009, but then permanently closed in 2014.

In 2014, Hall opened a second iteration of The Gorbals restaurant in Williamsburg, Brooklyn. He redesigned the menu with an Israeli Barbecue concept in 2015 and renamed the restaurant ESH, the Hebrew word for fire. ESH closed in September 2016.

Hall opened Ramen Hood in Los Angeles at Grand Central Market in 2015.

Hall hosted Knife Fight, a cooking competition show on the Esquire Network for four seasons. The show ended in 2017 when NBCUniversal announced it was shutting down the Esquire Network cable channel.

References

External links
Bio at the Top Chef website
Bravo’s New Top Chef Tells All Review at the Food & Wine website
Ilan Hall beats Marcel Vigneron to become 'Top Chef 2' champion Article at Realitytvworld.com
Great Neck to Great Chef? Article at Newsday.com

Top Chef winners
Living people
American male chefs
American chefs
Chefs from New York (state)
American people of Scottish-Jewish descent
American people of Israeli descent
Culinary Institute of America alumni
People from Great Neck, New York
Jewish American chefs
Chefs from California
American restaurateurs
Year of birth missing (living people)
21st-century American Jews
Chefs from Los Angeles